Mohamed Jedidi (born 10 September 1978) is a Tunisian former footballer who played as a midfielder.

Career
Born in Grombalia, Jedidi played club football in Tunisia and Libya for ES Zarzis, US Monastir, Étoile du Sahel, Stade Tunisien and Asswehly.

He earned 13 caps for Tunisia between 2003 and 2004, making a further 3 appearances for them at the 2004 Summer Olympics.

Honours
Tunisia
 Africa Cup of Nations: 2004

References

1978 births
Living people
Association football midfielders
Tunisian footballers
ES Zarzis players
US Monastir (football) players
Étoile Sportive du Sahel players
Stade Tunisien players
Asswehly S.C. players
Tunisian expatriate footballers
Tunisian expatriate sportspeople in Libya
Expatriate footballers in Libya
Tunisia international footballers
Footballers at the 2004 Summer Olympics
Olympic footballers of Tunisia
2004 African Cup of Nations players
People from Nabeul Governorate
Libyan Premier League players